Coast Guard Pacific Area & Defense Forces West (PACAREA) is an Area Command of the United States Coast Guard, a regional command element and force provider tasked with maritime safety, security, and stewardship throughout the Pacific. The command's area of responsibility encompasses six of the seven continents, 71 countries, and more than 74 million square miles of ocean—from the U.S. Western States to the waters off the east coast of Africa, and from the Arctic to Antarctica. Pacific Area has primary responsibilities for all Coast Guard operations throughout this area of responsibility.

Organizational structure

Commander, U.S. Coast Guard Pacific Area is concurrently Commander of Defense Forces West, and is located at Coast Guard Island in Alameda, California.

Pacific Area is divided into four operational regions called districts, each overseen by a two-star Rear Admiral. The 11th Coast Guard District is co-located with Pacific Area and oversees all Coast Guard operations from the California/Oregon border, south to Guatemala and out 200 miles to sea. The 13th Coast Guard District is headquartered in Seattle, Washington and maintains responsibility for Coast Guard operations throughout the Pacific Northwest. The 17th Coast Guard District is based in Juneau, with responsibility for all Coast Guard operations in Alaska. The 14th Coast Guard District has responsibility for Coast Guard operations throughout a 12.2 million square mile region that encompasses the Hawaiian Islands, Guam, American Samoa, and Coast Guard activities in Saipan, Singapore, and Japan.

The Pacific Area and its subordinate units employ 13,000 active duty and reserve members, Coast Guard Auxiliarists, and civilian employees.

Operational assets

In addition to assets at each of its subordinate units, the Pacific Area command's operational assets include:

 3 National Security Cutters
 8 High Endurance Cutters
 4 Medium Endurance Cutters
 3 Polar Ice Breakers
 29 Patrol Boats
 12 Buoy Tenders
 11 Sectors
 10 Air Stations
 13 HC-130 Fixed-Wing Aircraft
 26 HH-65 Dolphin Helicopters
 13 HH-60 Jayhawk Helicopters

Pacific Area also oversees the Deployable Specialized Forces (DSFs), which include the National Strike Force, Tactical Law Enforcement Teams, Port Security Units, and Maritime Safety and Security Teams.

List of commanders
Thomas H. Collins, 1998
Charles E. Larkin, 2000
Harvey E. Johnson Jr., June 2004
Charles D. Wurster, May 2006
David Pekoske, 29 May 2008
Jody A. Breckenridge, 10 July 2009
Manson K. Brown, 18 May 2010
Paul F. Zukunft, 27 April 2012
Charles W. Ray, 22 April 2014
Fred M. Midgette, 15 August 2016
Linda L. Fagan, 8 June 2018
Peter W. Gautier, 16 June 2021 (acting)
Michael F. McAllister, 30 June 2021
Andrew J. Tiongson, 8 July 2022

See also

 United States Coast Guard

References

Pacific Area
Military units and formations in California
Alameda, California